Lysne is a surname. Notable people with the surname include:

Anders Lysne (1926–2015), Norwegian educator
Anders Olson Lysne (1764–1803), Norwegian farmer
Geir Lysne (born 1965), Norwegian jazz musician
Jo David Meyer Lysne (born 1994), Norwegian guitarist and composer
Per Lysne (1880–1947), Norwegian-American artist 

Lysne the surname originates from Norway so it is in fact, Norwegian.